Phenylbiguanide (PBG) is a 5-HT3 agonist used to study the role of 5-HT3 receptors in the central nervous system. It has been found to trigger dopamine release in the nucleus accumbens of rats.

Derivatives
Phenylbiguanide is used to make amanozine and benfosformin.

References 

5-HT3 agonists
Biguanides